Sun Sopanha (born 2 March 1985 in Phnom Penh, Cambodia) is Cambodian footballer who plays for home town club Asia Euro United in Cambodian League. He was called to Cambodia national football team at 2014 FIFA World Cup qualification.

Honours

Club
Phnom Penh Crown
Cambodian League: 2008,2010,2011
Hun Sen Cup: 2008,2009
2011 AFC President's Cup: Runner up

Nagacorp FC
Hun Sen Cup: 2013

References

External links
 

1985 births
Living people
Cambodian footballers
Cambodia international footballers
Sportspeople from Phnom Penh
Association football midfielders
Nagaworld FC players
Phnom Penh Crown FC players